Susanna Lee Hoffs (born January 17, 1959) is an American singer, guitarist, songwriter and actress best known as a co-founder of the pop-rock band The Bangles.
Hoffs founded The Bangles (originally called the Bangs) in 1981 with Debbi and Vicki Peterson. They released their first full length album All Over the Place on Columbia Records in 1984. Hoffs started a solo career after The Bangles disbanded in 1989. She released her first solo album, When You're a Boy, in 1991. She later formed the faux British 1960s band Ming Tea with Mike Myers and Matthew Sweet. Hoffs has also appeared in a supporting role in several movies.

Early life 
Hoffs was born in Los Angeles, California, to a Jewish family. She is the daughter of film director/writer/producer Tamar Ruth (née Simon) and Joshua Allen Hoffs, a psychoanalyst. Her mother played Beatles music for Hoffs when she was a child, and she began playing the guitar in her teens. Hoffs attended Palisades High School in Pacific Palisades, Los Angeles, graduating in 1976. While in college, she worked as a production assistant and made her acting debut in the 1978 film Stony Island.

In 1980, Hoffs graduated from the University of California, Berkeley, with a bachelor's degree in art. When she entered college, she was a fan of classic rock bands that played in large stadiums, and while a student, she attended the final Sex Pistols show at Winterland Ballroom and a Patti Smith concert. Exposure to punk rock changed her career goal from a dancer to musician in a band.

Career

The Psychiatrists/The Unconscious 
Hoffs, David Roback, and his brother Stephen Roback started their first band together, The Psychiatrists/The Unconscious, in the late 1970s while Hoffs was a student at the University of California, Berkeley.

The Bangs 
Inspired by The Ramones and other punk bands, Hoffs founded the Bangs with Debbi and Vicki Peterson. After recording their first album, the night before it was pressed they learned of a legal claim by an East Coast boy band, called "The Bangs", requiring a sudden change of name, so the "Bangs" morphed into the "Bangles".

The Bangles 

The Bangles' first recorded release was a self-titled EP in 1982 on the Faulty Products Label (which lived up to its name by folding during the first promotional tour). The Bangles released their first full album All Over the Place in 1984 on Columbia Records. They had a moderate hit with the single "Hero Takes a Fall", but their commercial breakthrough came with the album Different Light in 1986, which produced the hit singles "Manic Monday" (which Prince had written and passed along to the Bangles), "If She Knew What She Wants", and "Walk Like an Egyptian".

In 1986, Hoffs co-wrote "I Need a Disguise" for the album Belinda for Belinda Carlisle, from the all-girl group The Go-Go's. With increasing fame, Hoffs also appeared on the covers of numerous magazines, and the Rickenbacker guitar company issued a Susanna Hoffs model of the 350, which she customized herself.

In 1987, Hoffs starred in the film The Allnighter, which was directed by her mother Tamar Simon Hoffs, and also featured Joan Cusack and Pam Grier. The film was critically panned and failed at the box office. Hoffs later said: "It wasn't a great movie but the whole experience of it was great."

In 1988, the Bangles released their third album, Everything. The first single, co-written by Hoffs, "In Your Room" became a top 10 hit. Everything also produced their biggest-selling single "Eternal Flame", which was also co-written and sung by Hoffs.

In the BBC programme I'm in a Girl Group, Hoffs revealed she actually sang the studio recording of "Eternal Flame" completely naked due to producer Davitt Sigerson pranking her by telling her Olivia Newton-John had done the same thing. He later told Hoffs he had been lying.

In 1989, the Bangles formally disbanded. In the late 1990s, however, Hoffs contacted the other members of the Bangles with the hope of reuniting. They recorded the single "Get the Girl" for the second Austin Powers movie in 1999. Subsequently, they announced their decision to reunite full-time in 2000. Their fourth album, Doll Revolution, was released in 2003, and their fifth album, Sweetheart of the Sun, was released in 2011.

Solo career 

Hoffs released her first post-Bangles solo album, When You're a Boy, in 1991. It spawned a US Top 40 hit with "My Side of the Bed." In the UK, the single landed at No. 44 and spent 4 weeks on chart, and the album also landed decently in Europe.

Hoffs recorded another album in 1993–94 – including some songs written with Mark Linkous of Sparklehorse – prior to leaving Columbia Records, but the album remains unreleased. In 1996, Hoffs released her second solo album, Susanna Hoffs, on London Records. Although it was widely praised in the media and yielded a minor US hit (and a UK hit at No. 33 for 2 weeks) with a version of the Lightning Seeds' "All I Want," it was not a commercial success. She began sessions in 2000 for another solo album that also went unreleased, although a few of the songs, such as "Something That You Said" and "November Sun," would surface on a subsequent post-reunion Bangles album and on her eventual next solo release in 2012.

Hoffs recorded a cover of the Oingo Boingo song "We Close Our Eyes" for the 1992 Buffy The Vampire Slayer soundtrack, as well as the title song for the 1995 film Now and Then (film).

She recorded her cover of "The Look of Love" for the soundtrack of the first Austin Powers movie in 1997, Austin Powers: International Man of Mystery and a cover of ] "Alfie" for the soundtrack of the third, Austin Powers in Goldmember (The Powers films were directed by her husband, Jay Roach). 
Hoffs also contributed a song to the film Red Roses and Petrol (written and directed by Tamar Simon Hoffs), titled "The Water Is Wide."

Hoffs self-released her third solo album of new material (and her first full album since 1996), Someday, on her own Baroque Folk Label on July 17, 2012. It was distributed by Vanguard Records. Produced by Mitchell Froom, the album is influenced by the music of the 1960s. American Songwriter gave Someday a rating of 4.5 out of 5 stars and described it as "easily and undeniably Hoffs' most definitive musical statement to date.".

In 2016, Hoffs contributed vocals to "One Voice," the end credits song for the film A Dog Named Gucci, a track also featuring the talents of Norah Jones, Aimee Mann, Lydia Loveless, Neko Case, Brian May and Kathryn Calder. It was produced by Dean Falcone, who also wrote the film's score. "One Voice" was released on Record Store Day, April 16, 2016, with profits from the sale of the single going to benefit animal charities.

Ming Tea 
Mike Myers, singer-songwriter Matthew Sweet, and Hoffs formed the faux British 1960s band Ming Tea after Myers' Saturday Night Live stint in the early 1990s. They all adopted pseudonyms for the band, with Hoffs using the name Gillian Shagwell and Myers creating Austin Powers. The trio made a number of club and TV performances and had a minor hit with the song "BBC". Myers's then-wife Robin Ruzan encouraged him to write a film based on the character. The result was Austin Powers: International Man of Mystery, directed by Hoffs' husband Jay Roach. Ming Tea performed in all three Austin Powers films.

With Matthew Sweet 
In 2005, Hoffs teamed with Sweet to record several cover versions of classic rock songs from the 1960s, fifteen of which appeared on their album Under the Covers, Vol. 1, released in April 2006. The duo, who also use the monicker Sid 'n Susie, appeared on World Cafe on June 1, performing songs by The Marmalade, Neil Young and Linda Ronstadt, and giving an interview about the project. On July 18, they appeared on Late Night with Conan O'Brien to perform a song to promote the album and a tour. Sweet and Hoffs released a followup album, Under the Covers, Vol. 2, on July 21, 2009, featuring songs from the 1970s including covers of Fleetwood Mac, Carly Simon, Rod Stewart and others. In 2012 Under the Covers, Vol. 3 was released, this time featuring cover songs from the 1980s, the decade when both of their careers began.

In 2013, Hoffs collaborated with Sweet and Tim Robbins on a recording of the traditional song "Marianne" for the Sea shanty-themed compilation Son of Rogues Gallery: Pirate Ballads, Sea Songs & Chanteys.

Personal life 
Hoffs has been married to filmmaker Jay Roach since 1993—they have two sons. Roach converted to Judaism upon marrying her.

Hoffs' first novel, entitled This Bird Has Flown, is due to be released on April 4, 2023.

Discography

Albums and EPs

Singles

Filmography and appearances

References

External links 

 The Bangles official website
 
 

Living people
20th-century American actresses
20th-century American guitarists
20th-century American women guitarists
20th-century American singers
20th-century American women singers
21st-century American actresses
21st-century American singers
21st-century American women singers
Actresses from California
American acoustic guitarists
American Jews
American women pop singers
American women rock singers
American women singer-songwriters
American rock guitarists
American rock songwriters
American film actresses
American television actresses
Film producers from California
Jewish American actresses
Jewish American musicians
Jewish rock musicians
Jewish women singers
Rhythm guitarists
Guitarists from Los Angeles
Singers from Los Angeles
University of California, Berkeley alumni
The Bangles members
Rainy Day (band) members
Singer-songwriters from California
1959 births
Ming Tea members
American Jews from California